Carl Thomas Stolhandske (born June 28, 1931) is a former American football linebacker who played one season with the San Francisco 49ers of the National Football League (NFL). He was drafted by the 49ers in the first round of the 1953 NFL Draft. He played college football at the University of Texas at Austin and attended Robert E. Lee High School in Baytown, Texas. He was also a member of the Edmonton Eskimos of the Canadian Football League.

See also
List of Texas Longhorns football All-Americans

References

External links
Just Sports Stats
Fanbase profile
Tom Stolhandske trading card

Living people
1931 births
Players of American football from Texas
American football linebackers
American football defensive ends
Canadian football linebackers
American players of Canadian football
Texas Longhorns football players
Edmonton Elks players
San Francisco 49ers players
People from Baytown, Texas
Sportspeople from Harris County, Texas